In agriculture and gardening, hybrid seed is produced by deliberately cross-pollinated plants which are genetically diverse. Hybrid seed is common in industrial agriculture and home gardening. It is one of the main contributors to the dramatic rise in agricultural output during the last half of the 20th century. Alternatives to hybridization include open pollination and clonal propagation.

Hybrid seeds are used to improve the characteristics of the resulting plants, such as better yield, greater uniformity, improved color, disease resistance. An important factor is the heterosis or combining ability of the parent plants. Crossing any particular pair of inbred strains may or may not result in superior offspring. The parent strains used are therefore carefully chosen so as to achieve the uniformity that comes from the uniformity of the parents, and the superior performance that comes from heterosis. Elite inbred strains are used that express well-documented and consistent phenotypes (such as high crop yield) that are relatively good for inbred plants.

Hybrid seeds planted by the farmer produce similar plants, while the seeds of the next generation from those hybrids will not consistently have the desired characteristics. Controlled hybrids provide very uniform characteristics because they are produced by crossing two inbred strains.

History 

In the US, experimental agriculture stations in the 1920s investigated the hybrid crops, and by the 1930s farmers had widely adopted the first hybrid maize.

See also 

 F1 hybrid
 Hybrid (biology)
 Plant breeding
 Seed saving
 Sterile male plant

References 

Hybrid plants
Seeds
Breeding
Hybridisation (biology)
Intensive farming
Ornamental plants
Pollination management